Shark Bay is an Australian comedy-drama series or satirical soap opera. The 26 episode series screened on Foxtel in 1996.

Cast
 Rowena Wallace as Clarissa 
 Zoe Bertram as Kylie Delaney
 Dieter Brummer as Brad Delaney 
 Raelee Hill as Heather 
 Tina Thomsen as Debbie 
 Lisa Baumwol as Daphne/Delilah 
 Tiriel Mora as Justin Farraday
 Will Gluth as Peter Delaney 
 Joel Williams as Steve 
 Kate Gorman as Miranda Delaney  
 Francis O'Connor as Dr. Jane 
 Doug Penty as Rupert/Osbert  
 Adrian Lee    
 Scott Michaelson  
 Tottie Goldsmith
 Peter O'Brien    
 Roger Oakley

External links

Australian Broadcasting Corporation original programming
Australian comedy television series
Australian drama television series
Australian television soap operas
1996 Australian television series debuts
1996 Australian television series endings
Television shows set in Victoria (Australia)